Specialty or speciality may refer to:
 Deed, a contract in law
 Index of speciality, a geometrical invariant
 Speciality (album), an album by J-Pop singer Nami Tamaki
 Specialty (medicine), a field within medicine
 Specialty (dentistry), a field within dentistry
 Specialty Records, a record label
 Specialty show, a dog show of a single breed